Charlotte Temple is a novel by British-American author Susanna Rowson, originally published in England in 1791 under the title Charlotte, A Tale of Truth. It tells the story of a schoolgirl, Charlotte Temple, who is seduced by a British officer and brought to America, where she is abandoned, pregnant, sick and in poverty. The first American edition was published in 1794 and the novel became a bestseller. It has gone through over 200 American editions. Late in life, the author wrote a sequel that was published posthumously.

Synopsis
The book relates the tale of Charlotte Temple, who is enticed by a dashing soldier, John Montraville, to run away with him, but after they cross to America, he abandons her. It belongs to the seduction novel genre popular in early American literature.

The novel opens upon an unexpected encounter between the British Lieutenant Montraville and Charlotte Temple, a tall, elegant girl of 15. Montraville sets his mind on seducing Charlotte and succeeds with the help of his libertine friend Belcour and Mademoiselle La Rue, a teacher at the boarding school Charlotte attends. Mademoiselle La Rue had herself eloped from a convent with a young officer and "possessed too much of the spirit of intrigue to remain long without adventures." Montraville soon loses interest in the young girl and, being led by Belcour to believe in Charlotte's infidelity towards him, trusts Belcour to take care of Charlotte and the child she expects. 

Following the advice of her new-found friend and neighbor Mrs. Beauchamp, Charlotte writes home to her mother. Her parents decide to receive her, her father even goes to New York to come get her. Without any financial support - Belcour does not give her the money Montraville put into his hands for her - Charlotte has to leave her house and, having walked to New York on a snowy winter's day, asks the former Mademoiselle La Rue, now Mrs. Crayton, for help. But the now wealthy woman pretends not to even know her for fear of her husband discovering the role she played in the girl's downfall. Charlotte is taken in by Mrs. Crayton's servant and soon gives birth to a child, Lucy. The doctor, however, has little hope of her recovering and asks a benevolent woman, Mrs. Beauchamp, for help. Mrs. Beauchamp is shocked when she recognizes Charlotte Temple in "the poor sufferer". The following day, Charlotte seems "tolerably composed" and Mrs. Beauchamp begins "to hope she might recover, and, spite of her former errors, become an useful and respectable member of society", but the doctor tells her that nature is only "making her last effort" Just as Charlotte is lying on her deathbed, her father arrives and Charlotte asks him to take care of her child. 

Upon returning to New York, Montraville goes in search of Belcour and Charlotte. Learning of her death and burial from a passing soldier, Montraville is filled with remorse for his part in her downfall, and angrily seeks out Belcour, killing him in a fight. Montraville suffers from melancholy for the rest of his life. Mr. Temple takes Charlotte's child back to England. The novel ends with the death of Mrs. Crayton (the former La Rue), who is discovered by Mr. Temple in a London doorway, separated from her husband, living in poverty, and repentant for her involvement in Charlotte's downfall. Mr. Temple admits her to a hospital, where she dies, "a striking example that vice, however prosperous in the beginning, in the end leads only to misery and shame."

A sequel
The author wrote a sequel, telling the story of the daughter born to the unfortunate Charlotte, Lucy Temple. Still unpublished at the time of her 1824 death, it went to press in 1828 as Charlotte's Daughter, or, The Three Orphans, but later editions simply bore the daughter's name as title Lucy Temple.

Early Feminism
Women’s education in America during the 18th century was a highly contended issue. While some men believed education for women would interfere with their ability to perform their roles as mothers and wives, in the eyes of “Republican Motherhood”, women required some form of education to act with intelligent guidance for their husbands and children. Education for women mostly consisted of reading and writing in addition to domestic crafts such as sewing and needlepoint. The tension surrounding women’s education is encapsulated in Charlotte Temple as education is treated as both a virtue and a vice. It is at boarding school where Charlotte first meets Montraville while on a school outing; as academic scholar, Shelly Jarenski suggests that “the quasi-public sphere of school, distanced from the protection of home and family, is what allows Charlotte to be seen and ultimately victimised”. School is also culpable for Madame La Rue’s influence over Charlotte, who uses her power as a teacher to manipulate Charlotte into ruining herself in the eyes of society. However, Jarenski also remarks that it is not education that fails Charlotte but her choices that dictate her fate. Through Charlotte’s story, Rowson argues against those “who believed that education would ruin women for marriage and family life. Instead, they use their heroines' fates to show that it is precisely the refusal of available education that ruins women”. The subdued style in which Rowson encourages female education reflects the contemporary societal fears of women’s education. 

Rowson also uses Charlotte Temple to reflect the increased silencing of women that occurred at the time. The formation of the middle class came about in America during the 18th century, and with this, the social expectations of women and femininity changed. Upper and middle-class women were reduced to the private sphere, “trapped behind the walls of their homes, they were increasingly forced into silence”. Charlotte becomes increasingly silenced by male authority throughout the novel which represents the oppression of women during this time. Scholar Susan Greenfield suggests that the immense popularity and cultural impact of the novel come from the relatability of the silencing of Charlotte’s character. Greenfield also comments on the irony of this period’s history as “the same culture which insisted that women be private and silent also generated women's unprecedented access to written words”. The 18th and 19th century gave way to the rise of female authors and female readers, as well as fictional novels as literature. Greenfield notes that “The novel was as much a middle-class product as the domestic female”. Where Rowson differs from many other female seduction novel authors is her style of writing. Epistolarity was a common style of many seduction novels, Rowson, however, chose to narrate the novel which is described as maternal, like “a very human mother advocating for the ruined child”. Jarenski proclaims that through Rowson’s narrative intrusions she attempts to assert “ an authoritative female voice in a male-dominated public sphere”, creating a voice for the women who are silenced.

The Seduction Novel
The seduction genre, to which Charlotte Temple is a part of, grew in popularity after the Revolutionary War. The American Revolution simultaneously gave women more opportunities and agency whilst highlighting the “feminine weakness, delicacy and incapacity”.The genre’s female protagonists reflected the “same trepidation and endangerment that concerned the young country” making them easily identifiable with readers, primarily made up of young early American girls.

These feelings and contradictions are displayed in Charlotte Temple as it depicts “nightmare of dislocation, alienation and abandonment” reflecting the instability and chaos felt by Americans at the time. This allows readers to make sense of the world around them through Charlotte, seeing the consequences of having too much freedom and believing that one is allowed to do whatever they want and disregard social norms and traditions. 

Whilst representing and reflecting the fears and climate of a post-revolution America,  Charlotte Temple also acts as a cautionary tale for young girls. Whilst the new sense freedom empowered American girls, novels such as Charlotte Temple acted as a ‘worst-case scenario’, forcing them to proceed with caution around men. American and British law at the time would have allowed Charlotte, a 16-year-old girl, to consent to elopement, sex and marriage, however she still required her parents to formally get married.  

Tradition was still central to society and a woman’s actions had serious consequences for her own and her family’s social standings. In this way, Rowson also warns parents of their daughters’ potential sexual agency and the destruction that she could bring to the family, if she is allowed too much freedom. For young women without dowries, Charlotte’s story is especially important. For them, the result of being seduced and losing their virtue is not just losing credibility, it also includes being left alone and homeless.

Throughout the novel, storm motifs are used to reflect this “temptation and its consequences”. Through this metaphor, Rowson explores this new problem faced by women and how they were not effectively equipped to dealing with them – for example Charlotte uses her freedom to seduce Montraville but does not know what to do in the aftermath when she is left pregnant and alone in America. 

Rowson’s characters Belcour and Montraville are symbolic of the dangers women faced as they are “attracted only to the most singularly virtuous of girls and [are] not satisfied until [they have] succeeded in ruining her”. These characters represented the common sentiment held by men at the time – that men are entitled to women and their bodies because women are the subordinate sex. The downfall of the woman comes when she choose the wrong man – the ‘Belcour’ type of man that doesn’t prioritise marriage. 

Rowson’s Charlotte Temple acts as a magnifying glass onto early American society, revealing its isolating new position and the dangers faced by women.

Cultural Impact

Susanna Rowson’s Charlotte Temple is often described as America’s first bestseller, and even the nation’s first popular novel , selling more copies than any other novel in American history up until the middle of the 20th century .  Published in 1794, Charlotte Temple emerged during the rise of America as a new nation, which saw the population boom after the Revolutionary War and an increased focus on the education of children in the late 18th century. Thus, the didactic novel reached the largely young and literate white youth and was met with enormous popularity due to its fast and entertaining plot. It was also intended as a sort of survival manual for “the perusal of the young and thoughtless of the fair sex”, educating young women on the moral disparity between genders and the male-oriented cultural institutions that fostered such divisiveness.   Rowson’s characterisation of Charlotte as a young woman whose plight was a product of circumstance was relatable to women who also struggled to be independent agents in this post-revolutionary culture. 

Despite its authorial intent, Rowson’s novel was not only culturally significant and meaningful to young women. Many archival copies contain inscriptions reveal the novel was exchanged between men and women, their sons and daughters, and even grandchildren.  The volatility of the new nation spawned a general attitude of distrust, a lack of community, and a struggle to adapt to the rapidly changing country.  High rates of urbanisation as well as the immigration of lower-class Europeans in the 18th century resulted in an extensive cultural transformation of America, with large proportions of the diverse society coming from rural lifestyles.  Many new American readers undeniably related to Charlotte’s plight in the new world as they too felt abandoned and alienated while coping with worldly change. 

200 subsequent editions were published in the 50 years after its release, all of which were tailored to different audiences and as Davidson writes, all “perform[ing] different kinds of cultural work”.   Cheaper tabloid editions reached the lower classes and educational children’s editions used Charlotte’s tragic story of seduction, abandonment, and eventual death as a parable of caution.  Rowson’s sequel Lucy Temple was released posthumously in 1828, but an illegitimate sequel by J. Barnitz Bacon, titled The History of Lucy Temple, released in 1877 truly indicates the cultural phenomenon that was Charlotte Temple.  Davidson proclaims that the consensus in the 19th century was that “Charlotte Temple had managed to displace the Bible from the bedtables of America”. The cultural impact of Rowson’s novel materialised as a grave was built for Charlotte in Trinity Churchyard, New York City. A 1900 New York Daily Tribune entry says it “has been the Mecca of sentimental visitors”, revealing the grave received frequent visitors, a “rate of about fifty a day”, even a century after the publishing of the novel.

Sources 

Charlotte's seducer and Lucy's father, John Montraville, was apparently based in part on John Montresor, a first-cousin of the author, though there are also reflections of a then-current story about General John Burgoyne.

Notes

References

External links

 
 
 

1791 novels
18th-century British novels
Hull, Massachusetts
18th-century American novels
Novels by Susanna Rowson
Novels about teenage pregnancy